Jimmy Marks (February 14, 1945 – June 27, 2007) was a Romani American who lived in Spokane, Washington. He referred to himself as a "Rom".

Marks became widely known in 1986 when the Spokane police department raided his home, performed searches, confiscated property, $1.6 million in cash, and $160,000 in jewelry, without a valid search warrant. The police claimed that 35 items were from burglaries.

The Markses claimed that the cash was being held for other Romani families who did not trust banks. Marks brought suit against the city of Spokane for $59 million, and after 11 years the case was settled out of court for $1.43 million. The lawsuit has been cited as a landmark case in the civil rights of Romani Americans.

Due to bringing too much exposure to the Romani community of Spokane, Marks was deemed marime by the community and therefore an outcast. He was not invited to social events such as weddings and funerals and was refused food when he arrived uninvited.

References

External links
American Gypsy: A Stranger in Everybody's Land a documentary about Marks by Jasmine Dellal
 Spokesman Review Obituary
 Seattle Times Obituary
 Washington Post Obituary

2007 deaths
American civil rights activists
American Romani people
American people of Greek-Romani descent
Romani activists
People from Spokane, Washington
1945 births
All articles with dead external links
Vlax people
Curses